Tunnel Beach is a locality  southwest of the city centre of Dunedin, New Zealand. Located just south of St Clair, Tunnel Beach has sea-carved sandstone cliffs, rock arches and caves. Beyond the beauty of the rugged sandstone cliffs, its claim to fame is the tunnel down to the beach that a local politician, John Cargill, son of Captain William Cargill, had commissioned for his family in the 1870s. Local legend says that one or more of Cargill's daughters drowned while swimming at the beach, but there is no truth to this story.

The tunnel itself is rough-hewn, and still shows the marks of the hand working which created it. Originally a simple slope, concrete steps were added when it was opened to the public in 1983.

Access to the beach is via the DOC Reserve, and is open year round. The track  is a popular walking excursion. The tunnel descends 72 steps to the beach, and is dimly naturally lit. Note that the path down is steep and can be very slippery following wet weather.

Safety 
Swimming is not recommended at Tunnel Beach due to a rip that makes it dangerous. People have had to be rescued after getting into trouble on the track and in the water.

References 

Beaches of Otago
Tourist attractions in Otago
Natural arches
Rock formations of Otago